The 2010–11 Úrvalsdeild karla was the 66th season of the Úrvalsdeild karla, the top tier men's basketball league in Iceland. The season started on 7 October 2010 and ended on 19 April 2011. KR won its third title in four years, and 12th overall, by defeating Stjarnan 3–1 in the Finals. KFÍ and Hamar where relegated to 1. deild karla.

Competition format
The participating teams first played a conventional round-robin schedule with every team playing each opponent once "home" and once "away" for a total of 22 games. The top eight teams qualified for the championship playoffs whilst the two last qualified were relegated to 1. deild karla.

Regular season

Playoffs

References

External links
Official Icelandic Basketball Federation website

Icelandic
Lea
Úrvalsdeild karla (basketball)